Gerhard VI of Jülich, Count of Berg and Ravensberg ( – 18 May 1360) was the son of William V, Duke of Jülich and Joanna of Hainaut.

Gerhard was betrothed in 1333 (renewed 1342) to Margaret of Guelders, daughter of Rainald II of Guelders and Sophia Betrout.  However, this marriage was never consummated, likely due either to Rainald's death in 1343 or Margaret's death in 1344.  Gerhard was subsequently married about 1344 to Margaret of Ravensberg, heiress of Berg and Ravensberg (died 13/19 February 1389), daughter of Otto IV, Count of Ravensberg and Margaret of Berg.  Margaret's father Otto had no sons so at his death in 1328, the County of Ravensberg went to his brother Bernhard.  However, when Bernhard died in 1346 without issue, Margaret became the heir of Ravensberg, her elder sister Hedwig having died in 1336.  
Then, when Margaret's uncle, Count Adolf IX of Berg, died in 1348 without issue, Margaret also inherited Berg by right of her mother.  Thus, the titles to Berg and Ravensberg came into the house of Jülich where they remained until 1511 when they passed into the house of Cleves.

Gerhard completed several ineffective protective alliances and stood against the Archbishop of Cologne.  He won Hardenberg, Neviges, Langenberg, Remangen and Kaiserswerth, among others.

Gerhard died 18 May 1360 in a tournament in Düsseldorf and is buried with his wife in the Altenberg Abbey.

Family and children
Gerhard and his wife Margaret of Ravensberg had three children:

 Elisabeth (c. 1346 – aft. 1388), married Henry VI, Count of Waldeck
 William (c. 1348 – 1408), his successor
 Margaret (c. 1350 – 1425/29), married Adolph I of Cleves-Mark

Ancestry

References

External links 
 Lower Rhine Nobility
 Genealogie-Mittelalder.de

Counts of Berg
Counts of Ravensberg
Year of birth uncertain
1325 births
1360 deaths
House of Jülich